Charles Fuller Baker (March 22, 1872, Lansing, Michigan – July 22, 1927, Manila) was an American entomologist, botanist, agronomist and plant collector. He was the second dean of the University of the Philippines College of Agriculture, now the University of the Philippines Los Baños.

References

External links

Smithsonian Institution Archives
Charles Fuller Baker Field Book, 1923
Charles Fuller Baker Papers, 1913-1927

American entomologists
1872 births
1927 deaths
Botanists active in Asia
19th-century American botanists
20th-century American botanists
19th-century American zoologists
20th-century American zoologists